Keith MarQuez Haynes (born December 19, 1986) is an American-Georgian professional basketball player for Paris Basketball of the LNB Pro B. Haynes is a naturalized citizen of Georgia, and he played with the senior men's Georgian national team at EuroBasket 2011.

College career 
A native of Irving, Texas, Haynes played college basketball at Boston College, with the Boston College Eagles (2005–2007), and at Texas–Arlington, with the Texas–Arlington Mavericks (2008–2010).

Professional career
After going undrafted in the 2010 NBA draft, Haynes decided to pursue a professional basketball career in Europe, signing with Élan Chalon of the French Pro A League. He later played with the Spanish ACB League club Gran Canaria (2011–12), the German League club Artland Dragons (2012–13), and then signed with the Italian League club Olimpia Milano. He parted ways with Milano on December 29, 2013. He then signed with the Italian League club Montepaschi Siena for the rest of the season. In July 2014, he signed a two-year deal with the Israeli Super League club Maccabi Tel Aviv. On July 6, 2015, he left Maccabi and returned to Italy where he signed with Dinamo Sassari. On January 29, 2016, he was bought out of Sassari by Panathinaikos, for an estimated price of $100k. On July 5, 2016, he signed with Italian club Umana Reyer Venezia. In his second season with Reyer, he won the European fourth-tier FIBA Europe Cup championship.

Career statistics

EuroLeague

|-
| style="text-align:left;"| 2013–14
| style="text-align:left;"| Milano
| 10 || 0 || 13.5 || .250 || .273 || 1.000 || .9 || .4 || .2 || .2 || 3.0 || -.1
|-
| style="text-align:left;"| 2014–15
| style="text-align:left;"| Maccabi Tel Aviv
| 25 || 5 || 17.5 || .383 || .301 || .571 || 1.5 || 1.2 || .4 || .1 || 4.6 || 3.1
|-
| style="text-align:left;"| 2015–16
| style="text-align:left;"| Dinamo Sassari
| 10 || 10 || 29.4 || .408 || .417 || .833 || 1.4 || 3.2 || .4 || .5 || 13.0 || 10.3
|- class="sortbottom"
| style="text-align:center;" colspan=2 | Career
| 45 || 15 || 20.1 || .375 || .342 || .721 || 1.3 || 1.6 || .3 || .3 || 6.1 || 4.4

Georgian national team
Haynes represented the senior men's Georgian national basketball team at EuroBasket 2011, where he averaged 8 points per game, 1.6 rebounds per game, 1.2 assists per game, and 0.9 blocks per game.

References

External links
 Official Website
 MarQuez Haynes at acb.com 
 MarQuez Haynes at draftexpress.com
 MarQuez Haynes at eurobasket.com
 MarQuez Haynes at euroleague.net
 MarQuez Haynes at fiba.com
 MarQuez Haynes at legabasket.it 
 

1986 births
Living people
African-American basketball players
American expatriate basketball people in France
American expatriate basketball people in Germany
American expatriate basketball people in Greece
American expatriate basketball people in Israel
American expatriate basketball people in Italy
American expatriate basketball people in Spain
Artland Dragons players
Boston College Eagles men's basketball players
CB Gran Canaria players
Dinamo Sassari players
Élan Chalon players
Lega Basket Serie A players
Liga ACB players
Maccabi Tel Aviv B.C. players
Men's basketball players from Georgia (country)
Mens Sana Basket players
Olimpia Milano players
Panathinaikos B.C. players
People from Irving, Texas
Point guards
Reyer Venezia players
Shooting guards
Sportspeople from the Dallas–Fort Worth metroplex
UT Arlington Mavericks men's basketball players
American men's basketball players
21st-century African-American sportspeople
20th-century African-American people